South-West or Southwest Province may refer to:

 Southwest Australia, a bioregion in Western Australia;
 South-West Province (Western Australia), an electoral province of Western Australia;
 Southwest Region (Cameroon), a region of Cameroon (known as Southwest Province between 1983 and 2008).